State Route 34 (SR 34) is a state highway in the U.S. state of California. It runs through Ventura County from Rice Avenue in Oxnard to State Route 118 in Somis.

Route description
SR 34 is part of the California Freeway and Expressway System, and portions of the route in Oxnard and Camarillo are part of the National Highway System, a network of highways that are considered essential to the country's economy, defense, and mobility by the Federal Highway Administration.

It starts on the west at the intersection of Rice Avenue  and Fifth Street in Oxnard. It continues east then northeast on Fifth Street until it intersects Pleasant Valley Road in Camarillo. After continuing east on Pleasant Valley Road a short distance, it turns north onto Lewis Road until the intersection with Las Posas Road at the north city limit of Camarillo where Route 34 continues straight ahead as Somis Road.  It ends at Route 118 near Somis. This route originally began in Port Hueneme, but in 1965, the portion from Port Hueneme to Route 1 was deleted. Nevertheless, Route 34 mileposts add on these additional  along the signed route.

The route parallels the Southern Pacific Coast Line, which carries Coast Starlight, Pacific Surfliner and Metrolink Ventura County Line passenger trains, for almost its entire current length.

History
In 1933, a road from Hueneme to near Somis, going through Oxnard and Camarillo, was added to the state highway system. This road was numbered as Route 153 in 1935. In the 1964 state highway renumbering, SR 34 was defined with this routing, ending at SR 118 on the eastern side. In 1965, the highway from Port Hueneme to SR 1 was removed from the state highway system. The part of the highway in Oxnard was authorized by the state legislature to be turned over to the city of Oxnard in 2008.

Future
According to the 2017 Caltrans District 7 Transportation Concept Report for State Route 34, State Route 34 is on the list of routes recommended for relinquishment.

Major intersections

See also

References

External links

California @ AARoads.com - State Route 34
Caltrans: Route 34 highway conditions
California Highways: SR 34
2003 Caltrans District 7 Master System Plan Status Map

034
State Route 034
Buildings and structures in Camarillo, California
Oxnard, California